General Munro may refer to:

Hector Munro, 8th laird of Novar (1726–1805), British Army general
John Munro, 9th of Teaninich (1778–1858), British East India Company's Madras Army general
Ranald Munro (born 1960), Royal Air Force major general
Sir Thomas Munro, 1st Baronet (1761–1827), British East India Company's Madras Army general
William Munro (botanist) (1818–1880), British Army general